Ocotea glaucosericea is a species of plant in the family Lauraceae. It is an evergreen tree in the genus Ocotea. It is found in Costa Rica and Panama.

References

glaucosericea
Flora of Costa Rica
Flora of Panama
Trees of Central America
Taxonomy articles created by Polbot